Nhlanhla Tshabalala, better known as Frank Casino, is a South African rapper and record producer. He is known for his guest appearance on "Mayo" by DJ Speedsta with Shane Eagle, Yung Swiss and Tellaman.

He went on to release his major single titled "Whole Thing" which was later remixed by Riky Rick.

In 2018 the rapper released a lead singles "Come Alive" and "Sudded" the latter with guest appearance from Cassper Nyovest and Major League DJz from his EP Heroes of Tomorrow which was later certified Gold by the Recording Industry of South Africa (RiSA), the latter which was also set to appear in his INDEPENDENCE DAY album.

Discography 

 Heroes of Tomorrow (2018)
 Something From Me (2018)

References

External links 

 

Living people
People from Pretoria
South African rappers
South African record producers
South African musicians
People from Gauteng
South African composers
South African songwriters
Sotho people
21st-century rappers
21st-century South African musicians
Year of birth missing (living people)